Thachu oorani is a village locality near Mayakulam between Kilakkarai and Erwadi dargah in the East Coast Road in Ramanathapuram district in Tamil Nadu.

References

Villages in Ramanathapuram district
Sufi shrines in India
Ziyarat
Dargahs in India
Islam in Tamil Nadu
Dargahs in Tamil Nadu
Erwadi-related dargahs